Le Lorey is a commune in the Manche department in Normandy in north-western France.

Toponym
The name of the commune has been attested in various forms: de Loiré at the end of the 12th century, Loreium around 1210 and Loretum around 1280. The original toponym, lauretum, is of Latin origin and means "place where laurels are planted".

See also
Communes of the Manche department

References

Lorey